Edna is a 1997 adventure game developed by Black Raven and published by Signum.

References 

1997 video games
Adventure games